The 1998 Friuli-Venezia Giulia regional election took place on 14 June 1998.

Forza Italia, at its first appearance in a regional election, became the largest party with 20.6%, while Northern League came second with 17.3%, but the combined score of all regionalist parties was 26.3%.

After the election a government led by Roberto Antonione (Forza Italia) and composed of Forza Italia, Northern League, National Alliance, Christian Democratic Centre and Friuli Union was formed.

Results
Source: Friuli-Venezia Giulia Region

References

Elections in Friuli-Venezia Giulia
1998 elections in Italy
June 1998 events in Europe